By Heart may refer to:

 By Heart (Brenda K. Starr album) or the title song, 1991
 By Heart (Conway Twitty album) or the title song, 1984
 By Heart (Lea Salonga album), 1999
 By Heart (Matt Finish album) or the title song, 1993

See also 
 Rote learning